Joseph Hirsh Palitschinetzki (1805 – 27 November 1886) was a Jewish Biblical scholar.

He was instructor in the Bible in the rabbinical seminary at Zhitomir until its close, and was an assiduous student throughout his life. Palitschinetzki was the author of Ḳero miḳra (Zhitomir, 1874), on Biblical Hebrew and various other Biblical subjects. In this work, as well as in his articles contributed to different periodicals, he evinces a wide knowledge of the Hebrew language and literature. He left a number of unpublished works in manuscript.

Publications

References
 

1805 births
1886 deaths
19th-century Jewish biblical scholars
Jews from the Russian Empire
People from Berdychiv
People from Berdichevsky Uyezd